Georg Stach (15 July 1912 – 31 December 1943) was a German racing cyclist. In 1940 he won the German National Road Race and the Großer Sachsenpreis at the Sachsenring in Chemnitz.

References

External links
 

1912 births
1943 deaths
German male cyclists
Cyclists from Berlin
German cycling road race champions
German military personnel killed in World War II
20th-century German people